Regional and tribal Afghan leaders rose up and formed an alliance known as the Eastern Shura to oust the Taliban in Khowst Province and Nangarhar Province, during the War in Afghanistan. Mary Anne Weaver, writing in The New York Times on the fourth anniversary of al Qaeda's attacks on September 11, 2001, described the formation of the Eastern Shura as the result of surrender negotiations on November 13, 2001, between Mohammad Yunus Khalis and Osama bin Laden.

References

2000s in Afghanistan
Afghanistan conflict (1978–present)
History of Nangarhar Province
History of Khost Province